The Cabinet Schröder II was the state government of the German state of Lower Saxony from 20 June 1994 until 30 March 1998. The Cabinet was headed by Minister President Gerhard Schröder and was formed by the Social Democratic Party, after Schröder's winning of the 1994 Lower Saxony state election. On 20 June 1994 Schröder was re-elected and sworn in as Minister President by the Landtag of Lower Saxony. It was succeeded by Schröder's third and last cabinet.

Schröder left the position in 1998 upon being elected Chancellor. One member of this cabinet - Funke - was also part of Schröder's first cabinet as Chancellor.

Composition 

|}

Notes

Schröder II
1994 establishments in Germany
1998 disestablishments in Germany
Gerhard Schröder